The 2017 ITTF Women's World Cup was a table tennis competition held in Markham, Ontario, from 27 to 29 October 2017. It was the 21st edition of the ITTF-sanctioned event, and the first time that it had been staged in Canada.

In the final, China's Zhu Yuling defeated fellow Chinese player Liu Shiwen, 4–3, to win her first World Cup title.

Qualification

The following list of players was confirmed on 2 October 2017, based on the qualification system set by the ITTF.

Competition format

The tournament consisted of two stages: a preliminary group stage and a knockout stage. The players seeded 9 to 20 were drawn into four groups, with three players in each group. The top two players from each group then joined the top eight seeded players in the second stage of the competition, which consisted of a knockout draw.

Seeding

The seeding list was based on the official ITTF world ranking for October 2017.

Preliminary stage

The preliminary group stage took place on 27 October, with the top two players in each group progressing to the main draw.

Main draw

The knockout stage took place from 28–29 October.

See also
2017 World Table Tennis Championships
2017 ITTF Men's World Cup
2017 ITTF World Tour
2017 ITTF World Tour Grand Finals

References

External links
ITTF website

Women
2017 in table tennis
Table tennis competitions in Canada
International sports competitions hosted by Canada
ITTF
ITTF

de:World Cup 2017 (Tischtennis)